The Ecological Party for Progress (PEP) was a political party in Burkina Faso. It was led by Charles Salvi Somé. PEP was registered on May 6, 1991. In 1995 PEP merged with the Party for Social Democracy of Valère Somé and the Democratic Action Group, forming the Party for Unified Social Democracy (PDSU).

References

Defunct political parties in Burkina Faso
Political parties established in 1991
1991 establishments in Burkina Faso